Max Gomez, widely known as "Dr. Max", has been the medical correspondent/senior health editor alternately for the flagship television stations WNBC and WCBS-TV in New York City.

Formative years
Born in Havana, Cuba, Gomez graduated cum laude from Princeton University (1973) and earned a Ph.D. from the Wake Forest School of Medicine (1978). He was also an NIH Postdoctoral Fellow at New York's Rockefeller University (1978–1980).

Professional life
As the medical correspondent/senior health editor for the flagship television station WCBS in New York City (1994–1997), Gomez delivered segments on health, science and medicine on the 5 PM news. He held similar positions for WNBC in New York (1991–1994, 1997–2007), and earlier for KYW-TV in Philadelphia (1984–1991), and for WNEW-TV in New York (1980–1984). In July 2007, "Dr. Max", as he is known, rejoined WCBS as a freelance medical reporter.

Honors
Gomez has won seven New York Emmy Awards and two Philadelphia Emmy awards. In addition to his broadcast work, Gomez serves on the advisory board of HealthCorps.

Personal life
Gomez resides in New York City.

References

Living people
Year of birth missing (living people)
American television journalists
New York (state) television reporters
Philadelphia television reporters
Princeton University alumni
Wake Forest University alumni
American male journalists
Cuban physicians